Oshoke Abalu, also known as Pamela Abalu, is a Nigerian-American architect. She is the co-founder of the Love and Magic Company, a startup studio.

Early life and education 
Abalu was born in Lagos, Nigeria, and spent her early childhood in Kano, Northern Nigeria before attending an all-girls boarding school at the age of 10. Her father's work with the United Nations on agricultural economics introduced her to the globe, relocating her to diverse locales around the world. She graduated with a Bachelor's degree in Architecture from Iowa State University, located in Ames, Iowa.

In 2005, Abalu obtained her architecture license.

Career 
Abalu landed her first internship in architecture after her freshman year in college at the New York firm of Perkins Eastman. She has worked with many premier brands, including Bloomberg L.P., L’Oréal, and Goldman Sachs. She became the Chief Architect at MetLife in 2011, overseeing architectural design across the company's 1,500 properties in nearly 50 countries for more than 57,000 employees.

Oshoke is a co-founder of The Love & Magic Company, the faculty at The Inner MBA, and a Crain’s 40 Under 40 honoree in 2016. Oshoke and her work have been featured in Smart Planet, Real Simple Magazine, Domino Magazine, Interior Design Magazine, ABC, NBC, Fast Company, TED, BOLD TV and more.

References

External links
Press release: Metlife Celebrates Grand Opening of World-Class Global Technology Campus in Cary, North Carolina

Living people
Nigerian women architects
African-American architects
Iowa State University alumni
Architects from Lagos
Nigerian emigrants to the United States
Architects from New York City
American women architects
Year of birth missing (living people)
21st-century African-American people
21st-century African-American women